Alphonse Mattia (born 1947) is an American furniture designer, woodworker, sculptor and educator. In 2005, Alphonse Mattia was elected a Fellow of the American Craft Council (ACC).

Biography  
Alphonse Mattia was born in 1947 in Philadelphia, Pennsylvania. He was raised in an Italian American, Catholic family. He attended Philadelphia College of Art (now known as the University of the Arts) and graduated with a BFA degree. Mattia has a MFA degree in 1973 in industrial design from Rhode Island School of Design, where he also studied furniture under Tage Frid.  

Mattia taught at Virginia Commonwealth University (from 1973 to 1976); Boston University (from 1976 to 1985); the Swain School of Design (from 1985 to 1988); and at Rhode Island School of Design (starting in 1990). The Program in Artisanry had emphasized art over craft. Mattia's notable students included Emi Ozawa.

Mattia's work can be found in museum collections including at the Smithsonian American Art Museum, Museum of Arts and Design, Museum of Fine Arts, Boston, Philadelphia Museum of Art, Rhode Island School of Design Museum, and at the Fine Arts Museums of San Francisco.

References 

1947 births
Living people
Artists from Philadelphia
University of the Arts (Philadelphia) alumni
Rhode Island School of Design alumni
Virginia Commonwealth University faculty
Boston University faculty
Rhode Island School of Design faculty
American furniture designers
American people of Italian descent